The  is a Buddhist temple of the Shingon sect in Zentsūji, Kagawa, Japan. It was established in 807 by Kūkai, founder of Shingon Buddhism, who was born where the temple now stands. The oldest structure, the Shakadō Hall, dates to around 1677.

Zentsū-ji is the 75th temple of the Shikoku Pilgrimage. It is also one of the three temples on the tour that Kūkai visited, the others being Tairyūji and Muroto Misaki, as Kūkai mentioned them by name in his writings.

The temple is divided into the east precinct (tō-in) centered around the main hall (the Kondō Hall) and the west precinct (sai-in), where the Mieidō Hall stands over Kūkai's birthplace. The temple grounds burned down in the 16th century during the war-torn Sengoku period, and many structures have been destroyed and rebuilt over the centuries.

Notable buildings

East precinct (tō-in) 
Gojūnotō – five-storied pagoda and tallest temple structure. Current pagoda completed in 1902. An Important Cultural Property of Japan.
Kondō Hall– the main hall (hondō) of the temple. Last rebuilt in 1699. An Important Cultural Property.
Shakadō Hall – formerly stood over Kukai's birthplace as the Mieidō Hall until moved and renamed in 1831. Built sometime 1673–1680. A Registered Tangible Cultural Property.
Bell tower – Registered Tangible Cultural Property.
Nandaimon – Registered Tangible Cultural Property
Chūmon

West precinct (sai-in) 
Mieidō Hall – stands over Kūkai's birthplace. Current structure built in 1831; renovated in 1937. A Registered Tangible Cultural Property.
Nio gate – It was rebuilt in 1889. Registered Tangible Cultural Property.
Gomadō – It was rebuilt in 1889. Registered Tangible Cultural Property.
Henjōkaku

Temple treasures 
Gilt bronze finial of a pilgrim's staff – National Treasure
Preface to the Lotus Sutra decorated with Buddhas – National Treasure
Jizō Bosatsu ryūzō – Important Cultural Property
Kichijōten ryūzō – Important Cultural Property

Gallery

See also 
 Qinglong Temple - temple in China that Kūkai modeled Zentsuji after

National Treasures of Japan
List of National Treasures of Japan (writings)
List of National Treasures of Japan (crafts: others)

References

External links 

About ZENTSUJI
 Zentsuji temple - Kagawa Prefecture - Japan travel guide-title
 Fox and Amy in Japan Zentsuji Temple
  Zentsuji Temple  Kotohira 2  Shikoku  Japan Travel Guide and Information  att.JAPAN
 Documentary movie about the 88 Temple Pilgrimage
Guide to start the Shikoku 88 temples pilgrimage (french-english)
 Echoes of Incense - A Pilgrimage in Japan by Don Weiss
  A Shikoku Pilgrimage by Jasbir Sandhu

9th-century establishments in Japan
National Treasures of Japan
Important Cultural Properties of Japan
Shingon Buddhism
Pagodas in Japan
Buddhist temples in Kagawa Prefecture
Religious buildings and structures completed in 807